Timothy James Harris (born 29 October 1962) is an Australian Catholic bishop. He is the Bishop of Townsville in Queensland.

Early life 
Harris was born in Brisbane on 29 October 1962 to Shirley and Jim Harris. He has a sister named Jennifer. He was educated at Nundah Convent, Virginia State School and St Joseph's Nudgee College before working for five years as a public relations agent for the Bank of New South Wales.

Religious life 
He attained a Bachelor of Theology in 1991; and was subsequently ordained a deacon of the Archdiocese of Brisbane on 5 June 1992, receiving priestly ordination at the age of thirty on 18 November 1992.

Over the almost twenty-five years of his priesthood, he was first an Assistant Pastor in Grovely parish, and then in Caboolture parish; before being appointed parish priest of Corinda-Graceville in 1996, a position in which he served until he was transferred to Surfers Paradise in 2010.

He was appointed as the sixth Bishop of Townsville by Pope Francis on 8 February 2017, following the vacancy since 28 March 2014 when Bishop Michael Putney died in office. His episcopal consecration took place on 3 May 2017.

Personal life 
His hobbies include Irish music (especially ballads), the beach (having lived at Surfers Paradise for seven years), and sports of all kinds.

References

Living people
Roman Catholic bishops of Townsville
21st-century Roman Catholic bishops in Australia
1962 births